The Desperate Hours is a thriller novel written by Joseph Hayes in 1954. It concerns three escaped convicts and their invasion of a suburban home and its family.

Adaptations
The Desperate Hours (1955 play)
The Desperate Hours (1955 film)
The Desperate Hours (1967 TV movie)
36 Ghante (1974 film)
Desperate Hours (1990 film)

Foreign Language Adaptions
36 Ghante (1974)-Hindi language film in India

1954 American novels
American thriller novels
American novels adapted into films
American novels adapted into plays
Random House books